Dush may refer to:

 Dush, Albania, a villages in Shkodër County, Albania
 Dush, Egypt, a villages at Kharga Oasis in Egypt's western desert
 Dush, Iran, a villages in East Azerbaijan Province, Iran
 Dush, Hashtrud, a villages in East Azerbaijan Province, Iran
 Dush-e Mian (Middle Dush), a village in Kermanshah Province, Iran
 Dush (crater), a crater on Mars, see List of craters on Mars